Amable Liñán Martínez (born Noceda de Cabrera, Castrillo de Cabrera, León, Spain in 1934) is a Spanish aeronautical engineer considered a world authority in the field of combustion.

Biography 
He holds a PhD in Aeronautical Engineering from the Technical University of Madrid, advised by :es:Gregorio Millán Barbany and Degree of Aeronautical Engineer from the Caltech advised by Frank E. Marble.

He is currently Professor of Fluid Mechanics and professor emeritus at the Higher Technical School of Aeronautical Engineers of the Polytechnic University of Madrid (attached to the Department of Motorcycle and Thermofluidodynamics of said school). He has taught at universities in California, Michigan and Princeton University in the United States and in Marseilles in France, among others. Since 1997 he is an adjunct professor at Yale University.

Research

He has focused his research studies on the basic problems of combustion, both reactor and planetary probe dynamics, in the latter case working directly for NASA and the European Space Agency. Also, his work of applying mathematics to the problems of combustion have been considered pioneers in the world, to the point that the letters of presentation and support of his candidacy for the 1993 Prince of Asturias Awards, coming from universities and Research centers in various countries, do not hesitate to consider it as a relevant world theoretician in the field.

The diffusion flame structure in counterflow is thoroughly analyzed by him in 1974 through activation-energy asymptotics.

Publications

He is the author of several books and scientific research.

Honors

In 1989 he was elected member of the Royal Academy of Exact, Physical and Natural Sciences. He is also a member of the Royal Academy of Engineering of Spain, France and Mexico. He is also a member of the scientific board of the IMDEA Energy Institute. He is also an elected foreign member of National Academy of Engineering for discoveries using asymptotic analyses in combustion and for contributions to advance engineering science. In 2007 he received the "Miguel Catalán" Research Award from the Community of Madrid and was awarded in 1993 with the Prince of Asturias Award for Scientific and Technical Research. A workshop in honor of Liñán's work was conducted in 2004 and the workshop papers are published in a book titled Simplicity, rigor and relevance in fluid mechanics : a volume in honor of Amable Liñán, CIMNE, (2004).

See also

References

External links
 

Spanish engineers
Fluid dynamicists
1934 births
Living people
California Institute of Technology alumni
Members of the United States National Academy of Engineering
Fellows of The Combustion Institute